Malogolubinsky is a rural locality (a khutor) in Golubinskoye Rural Settlement, Kalachyovsky District, Volgograd Oblast, Russia. The population was 171 as of 2010. There are 2 streets.

Geography 
Malogolubinsky is located on the right bank of the Don River, 44 km north of Kalach-na-Donu (the district's administrative centre) by road. Bolshenabatovsky is the nearest rural locality.

References 

Rural localities in Kalachyovsky District